Remo Rossi (born 10 April 1968) is an Italian former professional racing cyclist. He rode in the 1993 and 1994 Tour de France.

References

External links
 

1968 births
Living people
Italian male cyclists
Cyclists from the Province of Verona